Lisnagarvey High School is a mixed  secondary school located in Lisburn, County Antrim, Northern Ireland. It was established in 1957 and is within the South Eastern Education and Library Board. In 1990 the school officially allowed female students to  enrol into the school this has stayed to this day.

External links
Lisnagarvey High School

Secondary schools in County Antrim
Lisburn